Lori Ann Heuring (born April 6, 1973) is a Panamanian-born American film and television actress, perhaps most known for her starring role in 8mm 2, as Alice Richards in The Locket (2002), and as Mrs. Kesher in David Lynch's Mulholland Drive (2001).

Early life
She was born in Panama City, Panama and raised in Austin, Texas. She now lives in Los Angeles. She maintains family ties with her family in Panama and has one brother.
She graduated from the business honors program at the University of Texas

Career
Lori was born in Panama and did theatre growing up in Austin, but never really thought of acting as a career. About making acting her career she once quoted "I basically changed my mind every day when I thought about what I wanted to do with my life." Even in one point she was considering ice skating as her future. For choosing acting career she said "I guess that's why I like acting, you do get to change all the time, step into other people's shoes, I think it's important to re-discover aspects of yourself and life on a very regular basis, things change before your eyes, and I don't want to be ignorant of that by being too wrapped up in the way things already are. I want to be smacked into life every day."

Filmography
Just Go with It (2011)
Within (2009)
Hunger (2009)
Prom Night (2008)
Wicked Little Things (2006)
8mm 2 (2005)
Soccer Dog: European Cup (2004)
Perfect Romance (2004)
Runaway Jury (2003)
Taboo (2002)
The Locket (2002)
True Blue (2001)
Pretty When You Cry (2001)
Mulholland Drive (2001)
 Alias (2001) Eloise Kurtz/Kate Jones
The In Crowd (2000)
Early Edition (1998)
Animal Room (1995

References

External links

1973 births
Living people
Actresses from Austin, Texas
American film actresses
American television actresses
Panamanian emigrants to the United States
20th-century American actresses
21st-century American actresses